Gabriel Nigon (born 5 April 1956) is a Swiss fencer. He competed in the individual and team épée events at the 1984 Summer Olympics.

References

External links
 

1956 births
Living people
Swiss male épée fencers
Olympic fencers of Switzerland
Fencers at the 1984 Summer Olympics